Michael Wayne Gambrell (born January 10, 1958) is an American politician. He is a member of the South Carolina Senate, serving since 2016. He is a former member of the South Carolina House of Representatives from the 2nd District, serving from 2007 until 2016. He is a member of the Republican Party.

References

Living people
1958 births
Republican Party members of the South Carolina House of Representatives
Republican Party South Carolina state senators
21st-century American politicians